A list of Kannada language films produced in the Kannada film industry in India in 2018.
 Films are generally released every Friday or Festival Day 
 In addition films can be released on specific festival days.

Film awards events
 65th National Film Awards
 2017 Karnataka State Film Awards
 65th Filmfare Awards South
 7th South Indian International Movie Awards
 Suvarna Film Awards, by Suvarna channel.
 Udaya Film Awards, by Udaya Channel
 Bengaluru International Film Festival
 Bangalore Times Film Awards

Scheduled releases

January–June

July–December

Dubbed films

Notable deaths

See also
 List of Kannada films of 2019
 List of Kannada films of 2017

References

External links
 Kannada Movies of 2018 at Internet Movie Database

Lists of 2018 films by country or language
2018
2018 in Indian cinema